"Check the Meaning" is a song by English singer-songwriter Richard Ashcroft. It is the opening track on his second studio album, Human Conditions (2002). The song was released on 7 October 2002 as the first single from the album in the United Kingdom and peaked at number 11 on the UK Singles Chart. It also reached the top 20 in Ireland and Italy and peaked at number 21 in Canada.

Track listings
UK CD single 
 "Check the Meaning" (edit)
 "The Miracle"
 "Check the Meaning" (Chris Potter remix)
 "Check the Meaning" (alternative video)

UK 7-inch single and European CD single 
 "Check the Meaning" (edit)
 "The Miracle"

UK DVD single 
 "Check the Meaning" (album version)
 "Check the Meaning" (video)
 "You on My Mind in My Sleep" (4Scott live performance)
 Recorded live at London nightclub the Scala, 18 April 2002

Credits and personnel
Credits are taken from the Human Conditions album booklet.

Studios
 Recorded at Metropolis, Olympic, Astoria (London, England), and Real World Studios (Box, Wiltshire, England)
 Mixed, edited, and mastered at Metropolis Studios (London, England)

Personnel
 Richard Ashcroft – writing, vocals, guitar, bass, production
 Martyn Campbell – bass
 Chuck Leavell – piano
 Kate Radley – keyboards
 Pete Salisbury – drums
 Talvin Singh – duggi tarang, shruti box, nadal
 The London Session Orchestra – orchestra
 Gavyn Wright – concertmaster
 Steve Sidelnyk – drum programming
 Richard Robson – programming
 Chris Potter – production, mixing
 Hippy – editing
 Tony Cousins – mastering

Charts

References

2002 singles
2002 songs
Hut Records singles
Richard Ashcroft songs
Song recordings produced by Chris Potter (record producer)
Songs written by Richard Ashcroft